"Never Had a Dream Come True" is a song by British pop group S Club 7, released as a single in the United Kingdom on 27 November 2000. It was chosen to be the official 2000 BBC Children in Need song. The single peaked atop the UK Singles Chart, becoming Britain's ninth-best-selling single of 2000. Outside the UK, it peaked within the top ten on the charts of Ireland, Sweden, and the United States—where it reached number 10 and became the group's only single to appear on the Billboard Hot 100.

After its success, the song was added to a re-release of the band's second album, 7, and their third album, Sunshine.

Content
The song is about the aftermath of a break-up. The protagonist says that even though she might date other people, she will always have love for her former boyfriend. Jo O'Meara sings the lead vocals for the song while the rest of the members are in backup vocals.

Use in media
O'Meara sings the song as a solo in S Club's feature film, Seeing Double. The demo version of the song was also used as the opening theme in the television series S Club 7 Go Wild! and the S Club 7 Christmas Special. The instrumental version of the demo was briefly heard in the earlier special Artistic Differences. S Club 7 performed the song in the ITV Panto Aladdin.

Track listings

 UK Children in Need CD single
 "Never Had a Dream Come True" – 4:00
 "Perfect Christmas" – 4:38
 "Reach" (Almighty mix) – 9:12
 "Never Had a Dream Come True" (CD-ROM video)

 UK standard CD single
 "Never Had a Dream Come True" – 4:00
 "Spiritual Love" – 3:51
 "Stand by You" – 3:03
 "Never Had a Dream Come True" (CD-ROM video)

 UK cassette single
 "Never Had a Dream Come True" – 4:00
 "Perfect Christmas" – 4:38

 US CD single
 "Never Had a Dream Come True"
 "Spiritual Love"

Credits and personnel
Credits are lifted from the Sunshine album booklet.

Studio
 Mastered at Transfermation (London, England)

Personnel

 Cathy Dennis – writing, production
 Simon Ellis – writing
 Paul Gendler – guitar
 Oskar Paul – keyboards, programming, production
 Pete Murray – keyboards
 Anne Dudley – string arrangement
 James McMillan – additional programming
 Stephen Lipson – additional programming, additional production
 Heff Moraes – mixing
 James Reynolds – engineering
 Richard Dowling – mastering

Charts

Weekly charts

Year-end charts

Decade-end charts

Certifications

Release history

References

19 Recordings singles
2000 singles
2000 songs
A&M Records singles
Children in Need singles
Music television series theme songs
Number-one singles in Scotland
Polydor Records singles
S Club 7 songs
Songs written by Cathy Dennis
Songs written by Simon Ellis (record producer)
UK Singles Chart number-one singles